The World Association of Medical Editors (abbreviated WAME, pronounced "whammy") is an international, virtual organization of editors of medical journals. It was originally founded in 1995 by a group of members of the International Committee of Medical Journal Editors (ICMJE), who had grown concerned that the ICMJE had become "too small, self-serving, and exclusive". It was launched on March 16, 1995 in Bellagio, Lombardy, Italy, after a three-day conference was held to discuss ways to enable greater international cooperation between editors of medical journals. The conference was attended by twenty-two editors from thirteen countries, all funded by the Rockefeller Foundation. One of those in attendance was Iain Chalmers. Any editor of a peer-reviewed biomedical journal is eligible to join WAME.

References

External links

Organizations established in 1995
1995 establishments in Italy
Academic publishing